Bardestan (also Romanized as Bardestān; also known as Bardistan and Bardbestān) is a city in the Central District of Deyr County, Bushehr province, Iran. At the 2006 census, its population was 5,198 in 1,135 households, when it was a village in Howmeh Rural District. The following census in 2011 counted 6,078 people in 1,464 households, by which time Bardestan had risen to the status of a city. The latest census in 2016 showed a population of 7,112 people in 1,873 households.

References 

Cities in Bushehr Province
Populated places in Deyr County